Michael Young (born September 5, 1994) is an American basketball player for Stal Ostrów Wielkopolski of the Polish Basketball League. Young played college basketball for the Pittsburgh Panthers of the Atlantic Coast Conference.

Early years
Young went to St. Benedict's Prep in Newark, New Jersey and graduated in 2013 where he led Saint Benedict's to the National High School Invitational and finished runner-up, and also the New Jersey Prep High. During his senior year he led his team to a No. 2 ranking from both USA Today and MaxPreps. He helped guide St. Benedicts to the NHSI National Championship they finished as the runner up when they lost to Montverde Academy in the championship game 65-67.

During his senior campaign he was invited to the Jordan Brand Classic at the Barclays Center where he put up 19 points. Young also attended more prestigious basketball camps including Reebok Breakout Challenge, Five Star camp, Adidas Uprising and Hoop Group Elite. Young finished his high school career with 1,445 points and was ranked as the 56th overall recruit in the nation and the 14th best power forward in the nation by ESPN.

College career

Freshman year
Young started all 36 games for the Panthers. He was named to the All-ACC Academic Team which he called a huge accomplishment and was extremely proud. He averaged 6 points, just over four rebounds per game and scored in double digits in five games during the season. He put up nine points and three rebounds during his first NCAA Tournament game vs the Colorado Buffaloes in the 2014 NCAA Men's Division I Basketball Tournament during the opening round and scored four points in a loss to the No. 1 seed Florida Gators in the third round.

Sophomore year
During his sophomore year Young saw a huge increase in scored as earned All-ACC honorable mention by coaches in media, he averaged 13.4 points and 7.3 rebounds. He led the team in scored during 11 games and led in rebounding 17 times. He scored a season-high 27 points vs Chaminade Silverswords.

Junior year
Young during his junior year scored 20 points or more 11 times and averaged 15.7 points per game and 7.3 rebounds per game. And received All-ACC Third team awards and other All-ACC honors as well. He ranked 13th in the ACC in scoring,  12th in rebounds and 5th in field goal percentage. He led the team in scored and FG percentage. He also had a then career high four double-doubles.

Senior year
In the first four games of his senior year Young averaged 23 points per game and 8 rebounds per game leading Pitt to an 8-2 record. He scored a career high 30 points and grabbed 8 rebounds in a 78-76 win over Marquette. And almost matched that total 20 days later when he score 29 points and 9 rebound en route to an 81-73 win over Penn State at the Never Forget Tribute Classic.

College statistics

|-
| style="text-align:left;"| 2013–14
| style="text-align:left;"| Pittsburgh
| 36 || 36 || 21.6 || .413 || .357 || .817 || 4.1 || 0.9 || 0.4 || 0.4 || 6.0
|-
| style="text-align:left;"| 2014–15
| style="text-align:left;"| Pittsburgh
| 34 || 33 || 31.7 || .530 || .294 || .693 || 7.3 || 1.3 || 0.8 || 0.6 || 13.4
|-
| style="text-align:left;"| 2015–16
| style="text-align:left;"| Pittsburgh
| 33 || 33 || 29.4 || .537 || .333 || .777 || 6.9 || 2.3 || 0.5 || 0.3 || 15.7
|-
| style="text-align:left;"| 2016–17
| style="text-align:left;"| Pittsburgh
| 33 || 32 || 33.2 || .453 || .341 || .778 || 6.8 || 2.7 || 0.8 || 0.6 || 19.6
|}

Professional career

Washington Wizards / G-League (2017–2018)
After going undrafted in the 2017 NBA draft, Young was signed to a two-way contract by the Washington Wizards of the NBA. Under the terms of the deal, he was projected to split playing time between the Wizards and games in the G League under a designated spot best fitting Washington's area, since they did not hold a squad there at the time. He had previously been assigned to the Delaware 87ers for four games earlier in the season before being assigned to the Northern Arizona Suns on November 13, 2017. Young remained under contract with the Wizards until January 3, 2018, when they waived his contract without playing a game for the team. On January 6, 2018, the Northern Arizona Suns of the NBA G League announced they had acquired Young as a returning player.

Leones de Ponce (2018)
On April 11, 2018, Young signed with Leones de Ponce of the Baloncesto Superior Nacional.

Cholet Basket (2018–2019)
On July 30, 2018, Young signed with Cholet Basket of the LNB Pro A.

JDA Dijon (2019)
On July 23, 2019, Young signed with JDA Dijon Basket of the LNB Pro A. On December 5, 2019, his contract has been terminated by his club.

Hapoel Gilboa Galil (2020)
On January 12, 2020, Young signed with Hapoel Gilboa Galil of the Israeli Premier League as an injury cover for Justin Tillman. On January 18, 2020, Young recorded 19 points in his debut, while shooting 8-of-15 from the field, along with seven rebounds in a 96–80 win over Ironi Nes Ziona. In 18 games, Young averaged 17.1 points, 6.7 rebounds and 2.0 assists per game, helping his team reach the semifinals.

Al Nasr (2020)
On August 25, 2020, Young signed with Al Nasr of the UAE National Basketball League.

Ironi Nahariya (2020–2021)
On December 1, 2020, Young signed with Ironi Nahariya of the Israeli Premier League. He averaged 15 points, 6 rebounds and 2 assists per game.

Stal Ostrów Wielkopolski (2021–present)
On July 21, 2021, Young signed with Stal Ostrów Wielkopolski of the Polish Basketball League.

References

External links
ESPN profile
RealGM profile

1994 births
Living people
American expatriate basketball people in France
American expatriate basketball people in Israel
American expatriate basketball people in the United Arab Emirates
American men's basketball players
Basketball players from Pennsylvania
Cholet Basket players
Delaware 87ers players
Hapoel Gilboa Galil Elyon players
JDA Dijon Basket players
Leones de Ponce basketball players
Northern Arizona Suns players
People from Duquesne, Pennsylvania
Pittsburgh Panthers men's basketball players
Power forwards (basketball)
Sportspeople from the Pittsburgh metropolitan area
Stal Ostrów Wielkopolski players